Ske (or Seke) is an endangered language of south-western Pentecost island in Vanuatu. Ske is an Oceanic language (a branch of the Austronesian language family).

The Ske area comprises fourteen small villages centred on Baravet in south-central Pentecost, from Liavzendam (Levizendam) in the north to Hotwata in the south and extending inland to Vanliamit. Historically the language's area extended to parallel areas of the east coast, but this part of the island is now depopulated.

Due to intermarriage between language areas, an increasing number of people in Ske-speaking villages now speak Bislama as a first language, and Ske is no longer being actively transmitted to children. A closely related neighbouring language, Sowa, has already been totally displaced by Apma.

The number of Ske speakers is estimated at 300. The widely reported figure of 600 is probably an overestimate, since not everybody in the Ske area is fluent in the language.

There is no significant dialectal variation within modern Ske, although there are noticeable differences between the Ske of older and younger speakers. Doltes, the extinct dialect of Hotwata village, is sometimes regarded as a Ske dialect, but appears to have been closer to Sa.

There is no local tradition of writing in Ske, and until recently the language was virtually undocumented. However, linguist Kay Johnson has written a PhD thesis on the language, including a sketch grammar. Prior to her arrival, the only records of Ske were short vocabulary lists collected by David Walsh in the 1960s, Catriona Hyslop in 2001 and Andrew Gray in 2007.

Phonology
Following the orthography developed by linguist Kay Johnson in consultation with the Ske community, the consonants of Ske are b, d, g, h, k, l, m, n, ng (as in English "singer"), p, q (prenasalized [g], written ngg or ḡ in some sources), r, s, t, bilabial v, w, z, and labiovelar bw, mw, pw and vw.

A notable characteristic of Ske is the dropping of unstressed vowels. This has resulted in a language rich in consonants, in contrast to related languages such as Raga. Geminate consonants occur where two identical consonants have been brought together by the historical loss of an intervening vowel, for example in -kkas "to be sweet" (compare Sowa kakas). Due to the presence of consonant clusters within syllables and other phonological features not typical of the area's languages, speakers of neighbouring languages consider Ske difficult to speak and learn. 

Prenasalization of consonants occurs, so that b is pronounced mb, and d is pronounced nd.

Unlike neighbouring languages such as Apma, Ske permits a variety of voiced consonants to occur at the end of syllables, although when they occur at the end of an utterance they are often followed by an 'echo' of the previous vowel. Thus, iq "you", for example, is often pronounced inggi.

In addition to the five standard vowels (a, e, i, o and u), Ske has mid-high vowels é (intermediate between e and i) and ó (intermediate between o and u), like in Sowa and Sa languages. Vowels do not appear to be distinguished for length.

Stress typically occurs on the final syllable of a word.

Grammar
Basic word order in Ske is subject–verb–object.

Pronouns
Personal pronouns are distinguished by person and number. They are not distinguished by gender. The basic pronouns are:

Nouns
Nouns in Ske are generally not preceded by articles. Plurality is indicated by placing the pronoun nier ("them") or a number after the noun.

Nouns may be either free, or directly possessed. Directly possessed nouns are suffixed to indicate whom an item belongs to. For example:

dloq = my voice
dlom = your voice
dlon = his/her voice
dlon subu = the chief's voice

Possession may also be indicated by the use of possessive classifiers, separate words that occur before or after the noun and take possessive suffixes. These classifiers are:

no- for general possessions (noq tobang, "my basket")
blie- for things that are cared for, such as crops and livestock (blied bó, "our pig")
a- for things to be eaten (am bwet, "your taro")
mwa- for things to be drunk (mwar ri, "their water") and for buildings (mwan im, "his house")
bie- for fire (biem ab, "your fire")
die- for fruits that are cut open (dien valnga, "his bush nut")
na- for associations, over which the possessor has no control (vnó naq, "my home island")

The possessive suffixes are as follows:

A verb may be transformed into a noun by the addition of a nominalising suffix -an:

vwel = to dance (verb)
vwelan = a dance (noun)

Modifiers generally come after a noun:

vet = stone
vet alok = big stone
vet aviet = four stones

Verbs
Verbs are preceded by markers providing information on the subject and the tense, aspect and mood of an action. These markers differ substantially between older and younger speakers; the newer forms are in brackets below...

There is a pattern of verb-consonant mutation whereby v at the start of a verb changes to b, and vw to bw. This mutation occurs in imperfective aspect (present tense), and in irrealis mood (future tense):

ni va = I went
mwa ba = I am going
mwade ba = I will go

(Among a few older speakers there is also mutation of z to d, but most Ske speakers today use only the d forms.)

Hypothetical phrases are marked with mó:

ni mó umné = I should do it

Negative phrases are preceded by kare ("not") or a variant:

kare ni umné = I didn't do it

Transitive and intransitive verb forms are distinguished. Transitive verbs are commonly followed or suffixed with -né:

mwa róh = I move
mwa róh né vet = I move the stone

Ske makes extensive use of stative verbs for descriptive purposes.

Ske has a copular verb, vé or bé.

Verbs in Ske can be linked together in serial verb constructions.

Sample phrases

References

 Gray, Andrew. 2012. The Languages of Pentecost Island.
 Lynch, John and Crowley, Terry. 2001. Languages of Vanuatu: A New Survey and Bibliography.
 Tryon, Darrell, 1976. New Hebrides Languages: An Internal Classification: Series C - No. 50. Pacific Linguistics.

External links
 The Languages of Pentecost Island - further information on Ske
 ELAR archive of Ske (Seke) language documentation materials

Languages of Vanuatu
Penama languages
Endangered Austronesian languages
Severely endangered languages